The general speed limit in Switzerland is  outside and  inside build-up areas. These limits were introduced in 1984 to protect the environment. There are lower limits for trucks and vehicles with trailers.

History 

Here is a timeline of speed limits: All limits are in km/h.

Notes

References

Switzerland
Transport in Switzerland

de:Strassensystem_in_der_Schweiz_und_in_Liechtenstein#Tempolimite_in_der_Schweiz